In neuroanatomy, the medial lemniscus, also known as Reil's band or Reil's ribbon (for German anatomist Johann Christian Reil), is a large ascending bundle of heavily myelinated axons that decussate (cross) in the brainstem, specifically in the medulla oblongata. The medial lemniscus is formed by the crossings of the internal arcuate fibers. The internal arcuate fibers are composed of axons of nucleus gracilis and nucleus cuneatus. The axons of the nucleus gracilis and nucleus cuneatus in the medial lemniscus have cell bodies that lie contralaterally.

The medial lemniscus is part of the dorsal column–medial lemniscus pathway, which ascends from the skin to the thalamus, which is important for somatosensation from the skin and joints, therefore, lesion of the medial lemnisci causes an impairment of vibratory and touch-pressure sense.

Etymology
Lemniscus means "ribbon", so named because the medial lemniscus "spirals" or "turns" as it ascends.

Path
After neurons carrying proprioceptive or fine touch information synapse at the gracile and cuneate nuclei, axons from secondary neurons decussate at the level of the medulla and travel up the brainstem as the medial lemniscus on the contralateral (opposite) side. It is part of the posterior column-medial lemniscus pathway, which transmits touch, vibration sense, as well as the pathway for proprioception.

The medial lemniscus carries axons from most of the body and synapses in the ventral posterolateral nucleus of the thalamus, at the level of the mamillary bodies. Sensory axons transmitting information from the head and neck via the trigeminal nerve synapse at the ventral posteromedial nucleus of the thalamus.

Location through the brainstem
 The cuneate and gracile nuclei reside at the closed (lower) medulla, so the lemniscus is not formed at this level. Fibres from these nuclei will pass to the contralateral side of the brainstem, as the internal arcuate fibres.
 At the open medulla (further up the brainstem), the medial lemniscus contains axons from the trigeminal nerve (which supplies the head region), as well as the arms and legs. It sits very close to the midline, at the same orientation of the midline, with head fibres more dorsal (closer to the back), towards the fourth ventricle.
 By mid-pons, the medial lemniscus has rotated. Fibres from the head are medial, fibres from the leg are lateral.
 The orientation in the midbrain is similar to that in the pons.

See also
 Dorsal column-medial lemniscus pathway

Additional images

References

External links
 
 

Brainstem
Central nervous system pathways
Somatosensory system
Thalamus